Culex stigmatasoma is a mosquito species that appears in Southern California, Oregon, and Texas.  It is a confirmed vector of West Nile virus.

References

stigmatosoma
Insects of the United States
Insects described in 1907
Fauna of California